Carex roanensis is a species of sedge known by the common name Roan Mountain sedge. It is native to North America, where it can be found in the southern Appalachian Mountains. It was first collected on Roan Mountain in Tennessee in 1936. It was not collected again for fifty years. Now it is known from Georgia, Kentucky, North Carolina, Pennsylvania, South Carolina, Tennessee, Virginia, and West Virginia.

This plant forms small clumps of stems up to 85 centimeters tall. The stem bases and leaf sheaths are tinged maroon. The leaf blades are hairy. The inflorescence contains a terminal spike and two to three lateral spikes. There has been some question as to whether this plant is a true species, or perhaps a hybrid. Genetic analysis confirms that it is a species in its own right.

This plant grows in forests at moderate or higher elevations, sometimes in wooded areas but more often in the open. It is associated with beech and birch species. It may grow alongside the similar Carex species C. aestivalis and C. virescens.

References

External links
USDA Plants Profile

Further reading
Smith, T. W., et al. (2006). The geographic and ecological distribution of the Roan Mountain Sedge, Carex roanensis (Cyperaceae). Castanea 71(1) 45-53.

roanensis
Plants described in 1847